Wake Up! Wake Up! is Everyday Sunday's fourth full-length studio album released May 22, 2006. The album peaked on the Billboard Top Heatseekers chart at No. 26 and at No. 31 on the Christian Albums chart.

Track listing

References

2007 albums
Everyday Sunday albums